The Nordic Green Left Alliance (NGLA) is an alliance of Nordic left-wing parties, founded in Reykjavík, Iceland, on 1 February 2004. Initially founded by five parties representing Norway, Sweden, Denmark, Finland and Iceland, in 2009 two other parties from Greenland and the Faroe Islands joined the NGLA.

Members 

The member organisations of NGLA are:

Most of the member parties of NGLA have not joined the Party of the European Left (the Finnish Left Alliance and the Danish Red-Green Alliance being a recent exception), but NGLA participates in EL events as an observer.

In the European Parliament, the MEP of the Swedish Left Party, the Danish Red-Green Alliance and the Finnish Left Alliance are part of the European United Left–Nordic Green Left parliamentary group, whilst the Danish Socialist People's Party MEP is a member of the Greens-EFA group. The Irish Sinn Féin, the Basque EH Bildu, the Dutch Party for the Animals and the German Party Human Environment Animal Welfare have also joined the NGL.

Elected representatives of Member Parties

European institutions

See also 
 European United Left–Nordic Green Left

References 

 
Political parties established in 2004
Pan-European political parties
Eurosceptic parties
Party groups in the Nordic Council